Caloptilia columbaepennella is a moth of the family Gracillariidae. It is known from Italy.

References

columbaepennella
Moths of Europe
Moths described in 1839